In probability theory and statistics, a probability distribution is the mathematical function that gives the probabilities of occurrence of different possible outcomes for an experiment. It is a mathematical description of a random phenomenon in terms of its sample space and the probabilities of events (subsets of the sample space).

Examples of random phenomena include the weather conditions at some future date, the height of a randomly selected person, the fraction of male students in a school, the results of a survey to be conducted, etc.

Introduction

A probability distribution is a mathematical description of the probabilities of events, subsets of the sample space. For example, the sample space of a coin flip would be .

To define probability distributions for the specific case of random variables (so the sample space can be seen as a numeric set), it is common to distinguish between discrete and absolutely continuous random variables. In the discrete case, it is sufficient to specify a probability mass function  assigning a probability to each possible outcome: for example, when throwing a fair dice, each of the six values 1 to 6 has the probability 1/6. The probability of an event is then defined to be the sum of the probabilities of the outcomes that satisfy the event; for example, the probability of the event "the die rolls an even value" is 

In contrast, when a random variable takes values from a continuum then typically, any individual outcome has probability zero and only events that include infinitely many outcomes, such as intervals, can have positive probability. For example, consider measuring the weight of a piece of ham in the supermarket, and assume the scale has many digits of precision. The probability that it weighs exactly 500 g is zero, as it will most likely have some non-zero decimal digits. Nevertheless, one might demand, in quality control, that a package of "500 g" of ham must weigh between 490 g and 510 g with at least 98% probability, and this demand is less sensitive to the accuracy of measurement instruments.

Absolutely continuous probability distributions can be described in several ways. The probability density function describes the infinitesimal probability of any given value, and the probability that the outcome lies in a given interval can be computed by integrating the probability density function over that interval. An alternative description of the distribution is by means of the cumulative distribution function, which describes the probability that the random variable is no larger than a given value (i.e.,  for some ).

General probability definition

A probability distribution can be described in various forms, such as by a probability mass function or a cumulative distribution function. One of the most general descriptions, which applies for absolutely continuous and discrete variables, is by means of a probability function  whose input space  is related to the sample space, and gives a real number probability as its output.

However, because of the widespread use of random variables, which transform the sample space into a set of numbers (e.g.), it is more common to study probability distributions whose argument are subsets of these particular kinds of sets (number sets), and all probability distributions discussed in this article are of this type. It is common to denote as  the probability that a certain value of the variable  belongs to a certain event .

The above probability function only characterizes a probability distribution if it satisfies all the Kolmogorov axioms, that is:
 , so the probability is non-negative
 , so no probability exceeds 
  for any disjoint family of sets 

Probability distributions usually belong to one of two classes. A discrete probability distribution is applicable to the scenarios where the set of possible outcomes is discrete (e.g. a coin toss, a roll of a die) and the probabilities are encoded by a discrete list of the probabilities of the outcomes; in this case the discrete probability distribution is known as probability mass function. On the other hand, absolutely continuous probability distributions are applicable to scenarios where the set of possible outcomes can take on values in a continuous range (e.g. real numbers), such as the temperature on a given day. In the absolutely continuous case, probabilities are described by a probability density function, and the probability distribution is by definition the integral of the probability density function. The normal distribution is a commonly encountered absolutely continuous probability distribution. More complex experiments, such as those involving stochastic processes defined in continuous time, may demand the use of more general probability measures.

A probability distribution whose sample space is one-dimensional (for example real numbers, list of labels, ordered labels or binary) is called univariate, while a distribution whose sample space is a vector space of dimension 2 or more is called multivariate. A univariate distribution gives the probabilities of a single random variable taking on various different values; a multivariate distribution (a joint probability distribution) gives the probabilities of a random vector – a list of two or more random variables – taking on various combinations of values. Important and commonly encountered univariate probability distributions include the binomial distribution, the hypergeometric distribution, and the normal distribution. A commonly encountered multivariate distribution is the multivariate normal distribution.

Besides the probability function, the cumulative distribution function, the probability mass function and the probability density function, the moment generating function and the characteristic function also serve to identify a probability distribution, as they uniquely determine an underlying cumulative distribution function.

Terminology 

Some key concepts and terms, widely used in the literature on the topic of probability distributions, are listed below.

Basic terms 
Random variable: takes values from a sample space; probabilities describe which values and set of values are taken more likely.
Event: set of possible values (outcomes) of a random variable that occurs with a certain probability.
Probability function or probability measure: describes the probability  that the event  occurs.
Quantile function: the inverse of the cumulative distribution function. Gives  such that, with probability ,  will not exceed .

Discrete probability distributions 
Discrete probability distribution: for many random variables with finitely or countably infinitely many values.
Probability mass function (pmf): function that gives the probability that a discrete random variable is equal to some value.
Frequency distribution: a table that displays the frequency of various outcomes .
Relative frequency distribution: a frequency distribution where each value has been divided (normalized) by a number of outcomes in a sample (i.e. sample size).
Categorical distribution: for discrete random variables with a finite set of values.

Absolutely continuous probability distributions 
Absolutely continuous probability distribution: for many random variables with uncountably many values.
Probability density function (pdf) or probability density: function whose value at any given sample (or point) in the sample space (the set of possible values taken by the random variable) can be interpreted as providing a relative likelihood that the value of the random variable would equal that sample.

Related terms 
Support: set of values that can be assumed with non-zero probability by the random variable.
Tail: the regions close to the bounds of the random variable, if the pmf or pdf are relatively low therein. Usually has the form ,  or a union thereof.
Head: the region where the pmf or pdf is relatively high. Usually has the form .
Expected value or mean: the weighted average of the possible values, using their probabilities as their weights; or the continuous analog thereof.
Median: the value such that the set of values less than the median, and the set greater than the median, each have probabilities no greater than one-half.
Mode: for a discrete random variable, the value with highest probability; for an absolutely continuous random variable, a location at which the probability density function has a local peak.
Quantile: the q-quantile is the value  such that .
Variance: the second moment of the pmf or pdf about the mean; an important measure of the dispersion of the distribution.
Standard deviation: the square root of the variance, and hence another measure of dispersion.
Symmetry: a property of some distributions in which the portion of the distribution to the left of a specific value (usually the median) is a mirror image of the portion to its right.
Skewness: a measure of the extent to which a pmf or pdf "leans" to one side of its mean. The third standardized moment of the distribution.
Kurtosis: a measure of the "fatness" of the tails of a pmf or pdf. The fourth standardized moment of the distribution.

Cumulative distribution function
In the special case of a real-valued random variable, the probability distribution can equivalently be represented by a cumulative distribution function instead of a probability measure. The cumulative distribution function of a random variable  with regard to a probability distribution  is defined as

The cumulative distribution function of any real-valued random variable has the properties:
 is non-decreasing;
 is right-continuous;
;
.

Conversely, any function  that satisfies the first four of the properties above is the cumulative distribution function of some probability distribution on the real numbers.

Any probability distribution can be decomposed as the sum of a discrete, an absolutely continuous and a singular continuous distribution, and thus any cumulative distribution function admits a decomposition as the sum of the three according cumulative distribution functions.

Discrete probability distribution

A discrete probability distribution is the probability distribution of a random variable that can take on only a countable number of values (almost surely) which means that the probability of any event  can be expressed as a (finite or countably infinite) sum:

where  is a countable set. Thus the discrete random variables are exactly those with a probability mass function . In the case where the range of values is countably infinite, these values have to decline to zero fast enough for the probabilities to add up to 1.

A discrete random variable is a random variable whose probability distribution is discrete.

Well-known discrete probability distributions used in statistical modeling include the Poisson distribution, the Bernoulli distribution, the binomial distribution, the geometric distribution, the negative binomial distribution and categorical distribution. When a sample (a set of observations) is drawn from a larger population, the sample points have an empirical distribution that is discrete, and which provides information about the population distribution. Additionally, the discrete uniform distribution is commonly used in computer programs that make equal-probability random selections between a number of choices.

Cumulative distribution function
A real-valued discrete random variable can equivalently be defined as a random variable whose cumulative distribution function increases only by jump discontinuities—that is, its cdf increases only where it "jumps" to a higher value, and is constant in intervals without jumps. The points where jumps occur are precisely the values which the random variable may take.
Thus the cumulative distribution function has the form

Note that the points where the cdf jumps always form a countable set; this may be any countable set and thus may even be dense in the real numbers.

Dirac delta representation
A discrete probability distribution is often represented with Dirac measures, the probability distributions of deterministic random variables. If  is any event, then
 or in short, 

Similarly, discrete distributions can be represented with the Dirac delta function as a generalized probability density function , where  which means
 for any event

Indicator-function representation
For a discrete random variable , let  be the values it can take with non-zero probability. Denote

These are disjoint sets, and for such sets

This may serve as an alternative definition of discrete random variables.

One-point distribution
	
A special case is the discrete distribution of a random variable that can take on only one fixed value; in other words, it is a deterministic distribution. Expressed formally, the random variable  has a one-point distribution if it has a possible outcome  such that  All other possible outcomes then have probability 0. Its cumulative distribution function jumps immediately from 0 to 1.

Absolutely continuous probability distribution

An absolutely continuous probability distribution is a probability distribution on the real numbers with uncountably many possible values, such as a whole interval in the real line, and where the probability of any event can be expressed as an integral.

This is the definition of a probability density function, so that absolutely continuous probability distributions are exactly those with a probability density function.
If the interval  is replaced by any measurable set , the according equality still holds:

An absolutely continuous random variable is a random variable whose probability distribution is absolutely continuous.

There are many examples of absolutely continuous probability distributions: normal, uniform, chi-squared, and others.

Cumulative distribution function 
Absolutely continuous probability distributions as defined above are precisely those with an absolutely continuous cumulative distribution function.
In this case, the cumulative distribution function  has the form

where  is a density of the random variable  with regard to the distribution .

Note on terminology: Absolutely continuous distributions ought to be distinguished from continuous distributions, which are those having a continuous cumulative distribution function. Every absolutely continuous distribution is a continuous distribution but the converse is not true, there exist singular distributions, which are neither absolutely continuous nor discrete nor a mixture of those, and do not have a density. An example is given by the Cantor distribution. Some authors however use the term "continuous distribution" to denote all distributions whose cumulative distribution function is absolutely continuous, i.e. refer to absolutely continuous distributions as continuous distributions. 

For a more general definition of density functions and the equivalent absolutely continuous measures see absolutely continuous measure.

Kolmogorov definition 

In the measure-theoretic formalization of probability theory, a random variable is defined as a measurable function  from a probability space  to a measurable space .

Other kinds of distributions

However, this is not always the case, and there exist phenomena with supports that are actually complicated curves  within some space  or similar. In these cases, the probability distribution is supported on the image of such curve, and is likely to be determined empirically, rather than finding a closed formula for it.

One example is shown in the figure to the right, which displays the evolution of a system of differential equations (commonly known as the Rabinovich–Fabrikant equations) that can be used to model the behaviour of Langmuir waves in plasma. When this phenomenon is studied, the observed states from the subset are as indicated in red. So one could ask what is the probability of observing a state in a certain position of the red subset; if such a probability exists, it is called the probability measure of the system.

This kind of complicated support appears quite frequently in dynamical systems. It is not simple to establish that the system has a probability measure, and the main problem is the following. Formally, the measure exists only if the limit of the relative frequency converges when the system is observed into the infinite future. The branch of dynamical systems that studies the existence of a probability measure is ergodic theory.

Note that even in these cases, the probability distribution, if it exists, might still be termed "absolutely continuous" or "discrete" depending on whether the support is uncountable or countable, respectively.

Random number generation

Most algorithms are based on a pseudorandom number generator that produces numbers  that are uniformly distributed in the half-open interval . These random variates  are then transformed via some algorithm to create a new random variate having the required probability distribution. With this source of uniform pseudo-randomness, realizations of any random variable can be generated.

For example, suppose  has a uniform distribution between 0 and 1.

so that

This random variable X has a Bernoulli distribution with parameter . Note that this is a transformation of discrete random variable.

For a distribution function  of an absolutely continuous random variable, an absolutely continuous random variable must be constructed.

For example, suppose a random variable that has an exponential distribution  must be constructed.

A frequent problem in statistical simulations (the Monte Carlo method) is the generation of pseudo-random numbers that are distributed in a given way.

Common probability distributions and their applications 

The concept of the probability distribution and the random variables which they describe underlies the mathematical discipline of probability theory, and the science of statistics. There is spread or variability in almost any value that can be measured in a population (e.g. height of people, durability of a metal, sales growth, traffic flow, etc.); almost all measurements are made with some intrinsic error; in physics, many processes are described probabilistically, from the kinetic properties of gases to the quantum mechanical description of fundamental particles. For these and many other reasons, simple numbers are often inadequate for describing a quantity, while probability distributions are often more appropriate.

The following is a list of some of the most common probability distributions, grouped by the type of process that they are related to. For a more complete list, see list of probability distributions, which groups by the nature of the outcome being considered (discrete, absolutely continuous, multivariate, etc.)

All of the univariate distributions below are singly peaked; that is, it is assumed that the values cluster around a single point. In practice, actually observed quantities may cluster around multiple values. Such quantities can be modeled using a mixture distribution.

Linear growth (e.g. errors, offsets) 

 Normal distribution (Gaussian distribution), for a single such quantity; the most commonly used absolutely continuous distribution

Exponential growth (e.g. prices, incomes, populations) 

 Log-normal distribution, for a single such quantity whose log is normally distributed
 Pareto distribution, for a single such quantity whose log is exponentially distributed; the prototypical power law distribution

Uniformly distributed quantities 

 Discrete uniform distribution, for a finite set of values (e.g. the outcome of a fair die)
 Continuous uniform distribution, for absolutely continuously distributed values

Bernoulli trials (yes/no events, with a given probability) 

 Basic distributions:
 Bernoulli distribution, for the outcome of a single Bernoulli trial (e.g. success/failure, yes/no)
 Binomial distribution, for the number of "positive occurrences" (e.g. successes, yes votes, etc.) given a fixed total number of independent occurrences
 Negative binomial distribution, for binomial-type observations but where the quantity of interest is the number of failures before a given number of successes occurs
 Geometric distribution, for binomial-type observations but where the quantity of interest is the number of failures before the first success; a special case of the negative binomial distribution
 Related to sampling schemes over a finite population:
 Hypergeometric distribution, for the number of "positive occurrences" (e.g. successes, yes votes, etc.) given a fixed number of total occurrences, using sampling without replacement
 Beta-binomial distribution, for the number of "positive occurrences" (e.g. successes, yes votes, etc.) given a fixed number of total occurrences, sampling using a Pólya urn model (in some sense, the "opposite" of sampling without replacement)

Categorical outcomes (events with  possible outcomes) 

 Categorical distribution, for a single categorical outcome (e.g. yes/no/maybe in a survey); a generalization of the Bernoulli distribution
 Multinomial distribution, for the number of each type of categorical outcome, given a fixed number of total outcomes; a generalization of the binomial distribution
 Multivariate hypergeometric distribution, similar to the multinomial distribution, but using sampling without replacement; a generalization of the hypergeometric distribution

Poisson process (events that occur independently with a given rate) 

 Poisson distribution, for the number of occurrences of a Poisson-type event in a given period of time
 Exponential distribution, for the time before the next Poisson-type event occurs
 Gamma distribution, for the time before the next k Poisson-type events occur

Absolute values of vectors with normally distributed components 

 Rayleigh distribution, for the distribution of vector magnitudes with Gaussian distributed orthogonal components. Rayleigh distributions are found in RF signals with Gaussian real and imaginary components.
 Rice distribution, a generalization of the Rayleigh distributions for where there is a stationary background signal component. Found in Rician fading of radio signals due to multipath propagation and in MR images with noise corruption on non-zero NMR signals.

Normally distributed quantities operated with sum of squares 

 Chi-squared distribution, the distribution of a sum of squared standard normal variables; useful e.g. for inference regarding the sample variance of normally distributed samples (see chi-squared test)
 Student's t distribution, the distribution of the ratio of a standard normal variable and the square root of a scaled chi squared variable; useful for inference regarding the mean of normally distributed samples with unknown variance (see Student's t-test)
 F-distribution, the distribution of the ratio of two scaled chi squared variables; useful e.g. for inferences that involve comparing variances or involving R-squared (the squared correlation coefficient)

As conjugate prior distributions in Bayesian inference 

 Beta distribution, for a single probability (real number between 0 and 1); conjugate to the Bernoulli distribution and binomial distribution
 Gamma distribution, for a non-negative scaling parameter; conjugate to the rate parameter of a Poisson distribution or exponential distribution, the precision (inverse variance) of a normal distribution, etc.
 Dirichlet distribution, for a vector of probabilities that must sum to 1; conjugate to the categorical distribution and multinomial distribution; generalization of the beta distribution
Wishart distribution, for a symmetric non-negative definite matrix; conjugate to the inverse of the covariance matrix of a multivariate normal distribution; generalization of the gamma distribution

Some specialized applications of probability distributions 

 The cache language models and other statistical language models used in natural language processing to assign probabilities to the occurrence of particular words and word sequences do so by means of probability distributions.
 In quantum mechanics, the probability density of finding the particle at a given point is proportional to the square of the magnitude of the particle's wavefunction at that point (see Born rule). This is a key principle of quantum mechanics.
 Probabilistic load flow in power-flow study explains the uncertainties of input variables as probability distribution and provides the power flow calculation also in term of probability distribution.
 Prediction of natural phenomena occurrences based on previous frequency distributions such as tropical cyclones, hail, time in between events, etc.

Fitting

See also

 Conditional probability distribution
 Joint probability distribution
 Quasiprobability distribution
 Empirical probability distribution
 Histogram
 Riemann–Stieltjes integral application to probability theory

Lists 

 List of probability distributions
 List of statistical topics

References

Citations

Sources

External links

Field Guide to Continuous Probability Distributions, Gavin E. Crooks.

 
Mathematical and quantitative methods (economics)

it:Variabile casuale#Distribuzione di probabilità